The United States Open Tennis Championships is a hardcourt tennis tournament held annually at Flushing Meadows, starting on the last Monday in August and lasting for two weeks. The tournament consists of five main championship events: men's and women's singles, men's and women's doubles, and mixed doubles, with additional tournaments for seniors, juniors, and wheelchair players.

In 2005, Andy Murray was the defending champion in the boys' singles event, but did not complete in Juniors this year. The event was won by Ryan Sweeting of the Bahamas who beat Jérémy Chardy of France, 6–4, 6–4 in the final.

Seeds

Draw

Finals

Top half

Section 1

Section 2

Bottom half

Section 3

Section 4

References

External links 
 Main draw

Boys' Singles
US Open, 2005 Boys' Singles